Groen or de Groen is a surname of Dutch origin, meaning green. The name may refer to:
 Family de Groen

Alma De Groen (born 1941), Australian feminist playwright
Annemarie Groen (born 1955), Dutch Olympic swimmer
Arnoud van Groen (born 1983), Dutch cyclist
Bert Groen (born 1945), Dutch corporate director and politician
Dora van der Groen (1927–2015), Belgian actress and theatre director
Egbert B. Groen (1915–2012), American (Illinois) politician and lawyer
Els de Groen (born 1949), Dutch politician and Member of the European Parliament
Frédéric François Groen (1814–1882), Dutch shipbuilder
Geoffrey de Groen (born 1938), Australian artist known for his abstract works in oil and acrylics
Georgia Groen (fl. 2016), New Zealand barefoot water-skier
Guillaume Groen van Prinsterer (1801–1876), Dutch politician and historian
 (born 1992), Dutch cyclist
Jitse Groen (born 1978/1979), Dutch billionaire businessman, founder of Takeaway.com
Lou Groen (1917–2011), American restaurateur, inventor of the Filet-O-Fish sandwich
Marcel Groen (born 1945), Dutch-American Chairman of the Pennsylvania Democratic Party
 (Anglicized: Peter Green; 1808–1902), Dutch fisherman, "uncrowned king of Tristan da Cunha"
Richard de Groen (born 1962), New Zealand cricketer
Rob Groen (born 1938), Dutch rower
Sander Groen (born 1968), Dutch tennis player
Sara Groen (born 1981), Australian actress and television presenter
Sven Groen (born 1995), Dutch darts player
Tiemen Groen (born 1946), Dutch cyclist

See also
Groen River, river in the Northern Cape province of South Africa
GroenLinks, green political party in the Netherlands
Groen (political party), green political party in Belgium
Groen Brothers Aviation, Inc., American autogyro company founded by David and Jay Groen
Products: Groen Hawk 4, Groen ShadowHawk, Groen Sparrowhawk

References

Dutch-language surnames